Group B of the 2019 Copa América took place from 15 to 23 June 2019. The group consisted of Argentina, Colombia, Paraguay, and guests Qatar of the AFC.

Colombia and Argentina as the top two teams, along with Paraguay as one of the two best third-placed teams, advanced to the quarter-finals.

Teams

Notes

Standings

In the quarter-finals:
The winners of Group B, Colombia, advanced to play the runners-up of Group C, Chile.
The runners-up of Group B, Argentina, advanced to play the runners-up of Group A, Venezuela.
The third-placed team of Group B, Paraguay, advanced as one of the two best third-placed teams to play the winners of Group A, Brazil.

Matches

Argentina vs Colombia

Paraguay vs Qatar

Colombia vs Qatar

Argentina vs Paraguay

Qatar vs Argentina

Colombia vs Paraguay

Discipline
Fair play points would have been used as tiebreakers if the overall and head-to-head records of teams were tied. These were calculated based on yellow and red cards received in all group matches as follows:
first yellow card: minus 1 point;
indirect red card (second yellow card): minus 3 points;
direct red card: minus 4 points;
yellow card and direct red card: minus 5 points;

Only one of the above deductions were applied to a player in a single match.

References

External links
 
 Copa América Brasil 2019, CONMEBOL.com

Group B
Argentina at the 2019 Copa América